Thomas Coke (by 1458 – 9 June 1523) was an English politician.

He was a Member (MP) of the Parliament of England for Salisbury in 1489, 1497, 1504, 1510, 1512 and 1515. He was Mayor of Salisbury in 1491–92 and 1510–11.

References

15th-century births
1523 deaths
Mayors of Salisbury
English MPs 1497
English MPs 1510
English MPs 1512–1514
English MPs 1515